The Patient Health Questionnaire (PHQ) is a multiple-choice self-report inventory that is used as a screening and diagnostic tool for mental health disorders of depression, anxiety, alcohol, eating, and somatoform disorders. It is the self-report version of the Primary Care Evaluation of Mental Disorders (PRIME-MD), a diagnostic tool developed in the mid-1990s by Pfizer Inc.  The length of the original assessment limited its feasibility; consequently, a shorter version, consisting of 11 multi-part questions - the Patient Health Questionnaire was developed and validated.

In addition to the PHQ, a nine-item version to assess symptoms of depression, a seven-item version to assess symptoms of anxiety (GAD-7), and a 15-item version to detect somatic symptoms (PHQ-15) have been developed and validated. The PHQ-9, GAD-7, and the PHQ-15 were combined to create the PHQ-somatic, anxiety, depressive symptoms (PHQ-SADS) and includes questions regarding panic attacks (after the GAD-7 section). Though less commonly used, there are also brief versions of the PHQ-9 and GAD-7 that may be useful as screening tools in some settings. In recent years, the PHQ-9 has been validated for use in adolescents, and a version for adolescents was also developed and validated (PHQ-A). Although these tests were originally designed as self-report inventories they can also be administered by trained health care practitioners.

The PHQ is available in over 20 languages, available on the PHQ website. Both the original Patient Health Questionnaire and later variants are public domain resources; no fees or permissions are required for using or copying the measures. Additionally, the measures have been validated in a number of different populations internationally.

Versions 
The original Patient Health Questionnaire contains five modules; these contain questions about depressive, anxiety, somatoform, alcohol, and eating disorders. Designed for use in the primary care setting, it lacks coverage for disorders seen in psychiatric settings. Some modules are used independently, and variants have been developed based on the original items.

9-item depression scale 

The PHQ-9 (DEP-9 in some sources), a tool specific to depression, scores each of the 9 DSM-IV related criteria based on the mood module from the original PRIME-MD. The PHQ-9 is both sensitive and specific in its diagnoses, which has led to its prominence in the primary care setting. This tool is used in a variety of different contexts, including clinical settings across the United States as well as research studies.

One study which used the PHQ-9, examined if college student displays of depression symptoms on Facebook were representative of offline symptoms. Results demonstrated that those who displayed depression symptoms on Facebook scored higher on the PHQ-9, suggesting that those who display depression symptoms on Facebook are experiencing them offline.

2-item depression screener 

The Patient Health Questionnaire 2 item (PHQ-2) is an ultra-brief screening instrument containing the first two questions from the PHQ-9. Two screening questions to assess the presence of a depressed mood and a loss of interest or pleasure in routine activities, and a positive response to either question indicates further testing is required. This version of the PHQ has been shown to have good diagnostic sensitivity but poor specificity.

4-item depression and anxiety screener 

The Patient Health Questionnaire 4 item (PHQ-4) combines the PHQ-2 with the Generalized Anxiety Disorder 2 (GAD-2), an ultra-brief anxiety screener containing the first two questions from the Generalized Anxiety Disorder 7 (GAD-7).

15-item somatic scale 

The Patient Health Questionnaire 15 item (PHQ-15) contains the PHQ's somatic symptom scale. It is a well-validated measure, which asks whether symptoms are present and about their severity. A brief version, the Somatic Symptom Scale - 8 was derived from PHQ-15. The development of the PHQ-15 helped address three main problems in the assessment and diagnosis of somatoform disorders. Firstly, traditional methods of diagnosing somatoform disorders would only capture about 20% of true cases due to the number of symptoms required to meet a diagnosis. Secondly, in order to attain more reliable and valid data, assessments need to address more current rather than previous symptoms. Thirdly, continuing to adhere to the "medically unexplained" requirement for symptoms makes it very difficult to make a diagnosis because it is extremely hard to ascertain if a symptom is or is not part of a larger medical condition (ex: chronic fatigue and depression).

Somatic, anxiety, and depressive symptoms 

The Patient Health Questionnaire - Somatic, Anxiety, and Depressive Symptoms (PHQ-SADS) screens for somatic, anxiety, and depressive symptoms using PHQ-9, GAD-7, and PHQ-15, plus the panic symptoms question from the original PHQ.

7-item anxiety scale 

The GAD-7 is a 7-item scale designed to assess symptoms of anxiety. Each item is scored on a 0-to-3 point scale ("not at all" to "nearly every day"). Cut points of 5, 10, and 15 correspond to mild, moderate, and severe anxiety.

8-item depression scale 
The PHQ-8 is an eight-item scale developed specifically to screen for depression in American epidemiological populations.

Adolescent scale 
The PHQ-A is a four module self-report to evaluate depression, anxiety, substance use and eating disorders in adolescent primary care patients.

Reliability

Validity

Limitation 
All versions of the PHQ are self reports and, consequently, are subject to inherent biases, including social desirability and poor retrospective recall.

The influence of these biases can mitigated by following up with a structured or semi-structured interview, the gold standard for diagnostic assessment.

The time period assessed by each scale could also be a limitation; the PHQ-9 asks about the last four weeks, whereas the GAD-7 focuses on the past two weeks, and the PHQ asks about various time periods from the last two weeks to the last six months. Depending on the time period in question, this may or may not require a revision (i.e., if you are interested in depression over the last six months, you might alter the instructions), which could impact the validity of the measure.

The scoring thresholds recommended are influenced by the samples in which they were validated and correspond with different levels of sensitivity and specificity, which may or may not match well with the intended use of the scale.

See also
 Generalized Anxiety Disorder 7 (GAD-7)
 Somatic Symptom Scale - 8 (SSS-8)

References

External links
 
 Interactive version of PHQ-9

Depression screening and assessment tools
Anxiety screening and assessment tools